The 2012 West Texas A&M Buffaloes football team represented West Texas A&M University in the 2012 NCAA Division II football season as a member of the Lone Star Conference. The Buffaloes ended the regular season with 9–2 record (7–1 in the LSC) which was enough to claim a share of the Lone Star Conference title and to qualify for
the NCAA tournament as a six seed in region 4. West Texas A&M went on to win the NCAA Super Region Four Tournament but ended the season with a loss to Winston-Salem State in the National semi-final. With the 57–20 win over Western State September 8, eighth-year head coach
Don Carthel tied former head coach Joe Kerbel for the most wins in school history with 68 and he passes him a week later with win over Texas A&MKingsville. 2012 was also the season were West Texas A&M had multiple shutouts for first time since 2008.

West Texas A&M was ranked No. 24 the initial AFCA poll of the season.

Schedule

Coaching staff

TV and radio
West Texas A&M road games were brotcasted on KAMR-TV.

References

West Texas A&M
West Texas A&M Buffaloes football seasons
Lone Star Conference football champion seasons
West Texas  A&M Buffaloes football